A failed assassination attempted on Sultan Abdul Hamid II by the Armenian Revolutionary Federation (ARF) at Yıldız Mosque took place on 21 July 1905 in the Ottoman capital Istanbul. The Times described the incident as "one of the greatest and most sensational political conspiracies of modern times."

Background 

The assassination attempt was motivated by the events of the Hamidian massacres and Sultan Abdul Hamid II's anti-Armenian policies. 

Armenian resistance within the Ottoman Empire was planned by the Armenian national liberation movement, including the First Sassoun resistance of 1894, the First Zeitun Resistance in 1895, the Defense of Van in June 1896. The 1896 Ottoman Bank Takeover was the seizure of the Ottoman Bank on 26 August by members of the ARF in an effort to raise further awareness with twenty-eight armed men and women led primarily by Papken Siuni and Armen Karo who took over an enterprise largely employing European personnel from Great Britain and France. 

Generally, the ARF used the far-left tactics of that time, including direct action, guerilla fighting, assassination attempts against people seen as threats to the Armenian people or to the ARF. This would culminate later, during the Nemesis Operation, where the ARF killed some of the individuals responsible for the genocide.

Activity

Planning 
The ARF planned the assassination attempt on the sultan to enact vengeance. Dashnak members, led by ARF founder Christapor Mikaelian, secretly started producing explosives and planning the operation in Sofia, Bulgaria. During planning, the explosives were made at the improvised bomb-making factory in the village of Sablyar, near the Bulgarian town of Kyustendil. Mikaelian, alongside his friend Vramshabouh Kendirian, died in an accidental explosion. Despite losing the instigators of the operation, it continued as planned.

Sultan Abdul Hamid Han would pray every Friday at the Yildiz mosque and would usually leave around the same time each time, creating a pattern in his movement. Taking advantage of this, the ARF planned to hide timed explosives in a carriage parked outside the mosque which were to explode at the time that Sultan Abdul Hamid Han would leave the mosque. It was decided that Zareh, a fedayee and participant in the Ottoman Bank takeover, would drive the carriage.

Attempt 
On 21 July 1905, Zareh drove the carriage in front of the mosque. He set the timer for a planned 42 seconds. Sultan Abdul Hamid didn't show up on time because he got caught in a conversation with the Sheikh ul-Islam. The bomb was thrown at the Sultan but he escaped injury. The bomb went off, killing many with it, including Zareh. The Sultan arrived a few minutes later than planned.

26 members of the Sultan's service died. 58 from his service, as well as civilians in attendance, were wounded.

Aftermath
In the ensuing investigation other plots were unearthed. Belgian anarchist Edward Joris was among those who were arrested and convicted, before being released following the plead of the Belgian government.  Some Turkish also supported the attempt, like Tevfik Fikret, who wrote a poem asking for the next attempt to be successful.  
Globally, the assassination attempt further improved the opposition between the Ottoman Empire and the ARF, which would culminate in the Revolution of 1908 where the ARF took an active part supporting the Young Turks, seen at the time as a most progressive movement for the Armenian people.

Scientific research
In June 2013 an international workshop about the incident was organized by the University of Antwerp. The presentations were published in 2017 under the title To Kill a Sultan: A Transnational History of the Attempt on Abdülhamid II.

See also
The Ottomans: Europe's Muslim Emperors
Terror attacks in Istanbul

References

Bibliography 
 Translated from the Armenian: Mihran Kurdoghlian, Badmoutioun Hayots, C. hador [Armenian History, volume III], Athens, Greece, 1996, pg. 48.

Armenian Revolutionary Federation
Politics of the Ottoman Empire
1905 in the Ottoman Empire
Mass murder in 1905
Failed assassination attempts in Asia
1900s in Istanbul
Abdul Hamid II
July 1905 events
Armenian national liberation movement